The 17th Lok Sabha was formed by the members elected in the 2019 Indian general election. Elections, all across India, were conducted in seven phases from 11 April 2019 to 19 May 2019 by the Election Commission of India. Counting started officially on the morning of 23 May 2019 and the results were declared on the same day.

Om Birla was elected as speaker of the house. As no party holds 10% of the seats to secure the position of Leader of Opposition, currently, there is no leader of opposition. However, Adhir Ranjan Chowdhury is the leader of the Congress in the Lok Sabha, which is the second largest party.

Around 39 percent of members are professionally noted to be politicians or involved in social work.

Members 

 Speaker: Om Birla, BJP
 Deputy Speaker: Vacant
 Leader of the House: Narendra Modi, BJP
 Leader of Opposition:  Vacant 
 Secretary General: Utpal Kumar Singh

Party-wise distribution of seats

Statistics 

The 17th Lok Sabha has the highest ever number of women politicians with a total of 78 which is nearly 14%. The earlier Lok Sabha had 62 women MPs. The average age of 17th Lok Sabha is noted to be 54 years and 12% of MPs are below the age of 40. Chandrani Murmu of BJD from Keonjhar constituency became the youngest member at the age of 25 years, 11 months and nine days and Shafiqur Rahman Barq of SP from Sambhal constituency became the oldest member at the age of 89. Education-wise, 43% MPs have graduate-level education, 25% are post-graduates and 4% of members have doctorates in various subjects. Of the total strength, 300 members have been elected as member for the first time and 197 members have been elected second time consecutively i.e. they were a member in the 16th Lok Sabha as well. BJP members Maneka Gandhi from Sultanpur constituency and Santosh Gangwar from Bareilly constituency has been elected to Lok Sabha for the eighth time. Religion-wise, 90.4% members are Hindus and 5.2% are Muslims, with the rest, nearly 4%, being Sikhs, Christians and other minorities.

According to the NGO Association for Democratic Reforms (ADR), 233 members (i.e. 43%) have criminal charges against them. Of these, nearly 29% of the cases are rape, murder, attempted murder, or crime against women. Congress MP Dean Kuriakose, of the Idukki constituency in Kerala, has 204 criminal cases.

Financially, the number of members who are crorepati (i.e. with declared assets more than ) are 475. Members with more than  assets are 266.

Professionally, around 39% noted to be politicians or involved in social work. This is followed by 38% of members declaring as agriculturists and 23% as businessmen.

Bills 
As of November 2021, during the tenure of the 17th Lok Sabha, 12% of bills were referred to Parliamentary committees for examination.

See also 

 List of members of the 17th Lok Sabha
 List of Indian parliamentary committees

Footnotes

References

External links 
 Official website of the Election Commission of India

 
Terms of the Lok Sabha
2019 establishments in India